Mr & Mrs may refer to:

Mr & Mrs (TV series), a United Kingdom television show
Mr. and Mrs. (2012 film), a film starring Nse Ikpe Etim and Joseph Benjamin
 Mister and Missus (2003 TV episode), series 7 episode 8 of Where the Heart Is
 English honorifics, Mr and Mrs, among others including  Miss, Ms, Sir, Dr, Lady or Lord
Mr & Mrs (1992 film), directed by Sajan

See also
All Star Mr & Mrs
Mr. & Mrs. '55
Marriage